Gölcük is a village in the Çardak District of Denizli Province in Turkey.

References

Villages in Çardak District